The River Nore is one of the principal rivers (along with the River Suir and River Barrow) in the South-East Region  of Ireland. Along with the River Suir and River Barrow, it is one of the constituent rivers of the group known as the Three Sisters.

Starting in the Devil's Bit Mountain, County Tipperary, the river flows generally southeast, and then south, before its confluence with the River Barrow at Ringwood, and the Barrow railway bridge at Drumdowney, County Kilkenny, which empties into the Celtic Sea at Waterford Harbour, Waterford.

The long term average flow rate of the River Nore is 42.9 cubic metres per second (m3/s) The river is home to the only known extant population of the critically endangered Nore freshwater pearl mussel, and much of its length is listed as a Special Area of Conservation.

Name
The river is known in Irish as An Fheoir. The River Nore was mentioned in the Martyrology of Oengus the Culdee (Félire Óengusso Céli Dé), published before 824. A Middle Irish reference, from before 1420, refers to "The fair wide plain of the Feoir" (Fiond-chlár fairsing na Feoire).

The name is believed to derive from Irish  "green bank, edge or shore of sea, lake or river"; the Old Irish  means "green bank or shoreland."

Course 

The Nore rises on the eastern slopes of the Devil's Bit Mountain in the townland of Borrisnoe, County Tipperary. It then flows south-eastwards to County Laois and County Kilkenny before joining the River Barrow just north of New Ross near the Barrow Bridge. The river passes near Durrow, County Laois then through Ballyragget, the city of Kilkenny and then the villages of Bennettsbridge and Thomastown. Further south, it forms a picturesque V-shaped river valley, particularly notable near the village of Inistioge, the tidal limit. Major tributaries of the Nore include the Dinan, the Breagagh at Kilkenny City, the King's River, the Little Arrigle and the Black Water.

List of places along the river.
 Devil's Bit Mountain (begins)
 Castletown
 Durrow, County Laois (near)
 Ballyragget
 Kilkenny
 Bennettsbridge
 Thomastown
 Inistioge

List of tributaries

 River Erkina
 River Dinan (Dinin, Deen)
 White Horse (Mountrath River)
 Breagagh
 King's River
 Little Arrigle
 Black Water

Geology and morphology 
The Nore rises on a sandstone base but the catchment soon turns to limestone and remains so to the sea. The countryside is one of mixed farming, with some tillage, quite a bit of pasture and dairying and some bloodstock. The river has a fairly steep gradient but the flow is checked by innumerable weirs and it is probably true to say that shallow glides are the pre-dominant feature.

History 

In pre-Famine years, there were many water-powered industries in the Nore valley, particularly in the ten-mile (16 km) stretch between Kilkenny City and Thomastown, including breweries, woolen mills, sawmills, marble works, distillaries and grain mills. Flax and linen were produced just north of Kilkenny City.

Recreation 
Kilkenny fishing club has extensive fishing rights on the River Nore and its tributary, the River Dinan. Popular with anglers, it holds brown trout and salmon.

Some of these weirs along the river have good playboating qualities. The river is long and mostly flat and dotted with weirs at most of the villages it passes through.

Salmon runs on the river Nore were interrupted in 2005 and 2006 by a flood relief scheme in Kilkenny city carried out by the Office of Public Works. Initially budgeted at €13.1 million, the scheme was delivered at a cost in excess of €48 million  and did not contain suitable fish passes. This oversight has since been rectified at additional expense and salmon can now ascend the river upstream of Kilkenny city.

See also 
Rivers of Ireland
 Three Sisters
 River Suir
 River Barrow

References

Footnotes

Further reading

  
 
 
 

 
Ó Drisceoil, Cóilín (2011), River Nore Kilkenny Heritage Audit report vol.1 phase 1

External links 

 
 
 
 Song: "Floraline Shore" on IMSLP

Rivers of County Laois
Rivers of County Kilkenny
Rivers of County Tipperary